Peter Wheeler may refer to:
Peter Wheeler (broadcaster) (1934–2010), British broadcaster
Peter Wheeler (rugby union) (born 1948), English rugby union footballer
Peter Wheeler (TVR) (1945–2009), British chemical engineer, owner of TVR sports car company
Peter Wheeler (politician) (1922–2015), Georgia Commissioner
Peter Wheeler (runner) (born 1994), New Zealand long-distance runner